Li Yumin is a Chinese translator and professor at the Capital Normal University. He was one of the main translators of the works of French literature into Chinese, including The Hunchback of Notre-Dame, Les Misérables, The Three Musketeers, and The Count of Monte Cristo.

Biography
In 1963, Li graduated from Peking University, where he majored in French language. After university, he was sent abroad to study at the University of Rennes 1 on government scholarships.

Translations

References

Living people
Peking University alumni
20th-century Chinese translators
21st-century Chinese translators
French–Chinese translators
Year of birth missing (living people)